Simplicity is the tenth studio album from The Bouncing Souls and was released on July 29, 2016 on Rise Records in conjunction with Chunksaah Records, the band's own label. The album is also their first with drummer George Rebelo, who joined the band in 2013, replacing Michael McDermott. Production on the album was overseen by John Seymour, who previously produced the band's albums, How I Spent My Summer Vacation, and Anchors Aweigh.

Track listing

Credits
The Bouncing Souls
Greg Attonito – vocals
Pete Steinkopf – guitar
Bryan Kienlen – bass
George Rebelo – drums

Charts

References

The Bouncing Souls albums
2016 albums
Rise Records albums
Chunksaah Records albums